NORSAR or Norwegian Seismic Array was established in 1968 as part of the Norwegian-US agreement for the detection of earthquakes and nuclear explosions.

Description 
Located at Kjeller, north of Oslo, NORSAR runs and maintains seismic arrays in Norway and it is the designated Norwegian National Data Centre for the Comprehensive Nuclear Test Ban Treaty. NORSAR conducts basic seismological research, develops software and provides consultancy for the petroleum industry.

NORSAR was the first non-US site included in ARPANET in June 1973 with a connection via the Tanum Earth Station in Sweden to the Seismic Data Analysis Center (SDAC) in Virginia, United States.  It was the connection point for ARPANET to spread to Peter Kirstein's  research group at University College London (UCL) the following month in July 1973. Connecting through NORSAR, the Norwegian Defence Research Establishment, along with UCL and RSRE in Britain, were involved in testing TCP/IP. UCL provided a gateway between UK academic computer networks and the ARPANET via NORSAR.

Since 1999, NORSAR has been an independent research foundation.

See also 

 SATNET
NORDUnet

References

External links 
 

Government agencies of Norway
Research institutes in Norway
Foundations based in Norway
Organisations based in Skedsmo
Organizations established in 1968
Earth science research institutes
Seismological observatories, organisations and projects